Barton William "Bart" Bradley (July 29, 1930 – September 16, 2006) was a Canadian ice hockey centre. He played one game in the National Hockey League with the Boston Bruins during the 1949–50 season. The rest of his career, which lasted from 1949 to 1960, was spent in various minor leagues. Internationally Bradley played for the Canadian national team at the 1959 World Championships, winning a gold medal.

Playing career

Bradley played junior hockey in the Thunder Bay Junior Hockey League for the Port Arthur West End Bruins from 1946 to 1949, winning the playoff championship in 1948 and 1949 as well as the 1948 Memorial Cup. He turned pro in 1949 and signed with the American Hockey League's Hershey Bears, but was called up to play one game in the National Hockey League (NHL) for the Boston Bruins on March 22, 1950 against the Chicago Black Hawks; this would be his only game in the NHL. Spells in the United States Hockey League for the Tulsa Oilers and the Pacific Coast Hockey League with the Tacoma Rockets was followed by a seven-year tenure in the Western Hockey League, beginning with the Rockets who only lasted one season.  He then had spells with the Seattle Bombers, New Westminster Royals, Victoria Cougars and the Seattle Americans.

In 1957, Bradley began playing senior hockey, beginning with two seasons with the Belleville McFarlands.  He also played for the Port Arthur Bearcats and the Fort William Beavers before officially retiring in 1966.

Career statistics

Regular season and playoffs

International

See also
List of players who played only one game in the NHL

External links
  

1930 births
2006 deaths
Boston Bruins players
Canadian expatriate ice hockey players in the United States
Canadian ice hockey centres
Hershey Bears players
Ice hockey people from Ontario
New Westminster Royals (WHL) players
Ontario Hockey Association Senior A League (1890–1979) players
Seattle Americans players
Seattle Bombers players
Sportspeople from Thunder Bay
Tacoma Rockets (WHL) players
Tulsa Oilers (USHL) players